Astathes caloptera is a species of beetle in the family Cerambycidae. It was described by Pascoe in 1860. It is known from Borneo.

Varietas
 Astathes caloptera var. nigrobasiantennalis Breuning, 1956
 Astathes caloptera var. rufosternalis Breuning, 1956

References

C
Beetles described in 1860